Marcel W. "Mike" Fodor (17 January 1890 in Budapest, Hungary - 1 July 1977 in Trostberg, Germany; often cited as M. W. Fodor), was a foreign correspondent for several British and American newspapers in Vienna during the years between the world wars, editor of the Berlin edition of Die Neue Zeitung and correspondent for Voice of America in Europe after World War II, and an author who specialized in the Balkans and Central Europe.

Early life and education
Fodor was born as Marcel Vilmos (Mike William) Fodor in Budapest in 1890. His father, Janos Fodor, was a Danube Swabian whose family name "Fischer" had been translated into the Hungarian language as "Fodor" during the Magyarization movement of the late 1800s. Janos was a wealthy industrialist who owned newspapers in Vienna and Budapest. Fodor's mother, Berta Auspitz, was a member of a wealthy family of bankers and industrialists in Central Europe.

Fodor studied in Budapest and Charlottenburg, receiving a degree in chemical engineering in 1911. At the outbreak of World War I Fodor, a firm pacifist, immigrated to Great Britain, where he worked as a chemical engineer. However, he was soon interned as an enemy alien. At the conclusion of the War, Fodor returned to Budapest. In the revolutions that shook Hungary immediately after World War I, Fodor's parents were named as "class enemies" by the new communist regime and killed. In the turbulent years of war and revolution, their fortune was lost as well.

Early journalism
In Budapest, Fodor met and befriended journalist Dorothy Thompson. Fodor himself soon made the transition from chemical engineer to journalist, becoming the Vienna correspondent for the Manchester Guardian. Time described how and why Fodor's major career transition happened:
An engineer, fluent in five languages, [Fodor] had been grumbling along as manager of a steel mill in the English Midlands. Postwar retrenchment shut the mill, freed Fodor. The Manchester Guardian liked his occasional letters from Middle Europe, asked for cables, soon hired the shy, whip-smart, "relentlessly honest" little man as a fulltime correspondent. Thereby the Guardian conferred a major boon on U.S. foreign correspondence.

Interwar years in Central Europe
In the 1920s and the 1930s, Fodor worked as a journalist in Central Europe, posting stories with the Guardian; several major newspapers in the United States; and magazines such as The Nation, The New Republic and American Mercury.

In 1922, Fodor married Marie Martha Roob, born in Miskolc, Hungary. Their son Denis was born in the mid 1920s.

Covering the interwar turmoil in Central Europe, Fodor was a friend or mentor to several renowned journalists who covered the same beat, including Dorothy Thompson, John Gunther, Frances Gunther, William Shirer, George Eric Rowe Gedye, H. R. Knickerbocker, Edgar Mowrer, Frederick Scheu, Robert Best and others who frequented the Stammtisch at the Café Louvre, the unofficial headquarters of foreign journalism in interwar Vienna. Best and Fodor presided at the Stammtisch, where journalists and regular visitors discussed the days news and exchanged information. J. William Fulbright, who met Fodor and other correspondents at the Café Louvre, described a typical day:

Fulbright, who later served as US senator for Arkansas for 30 years and established the US foreign exchange program that bears his name, first met Fodor in Vienna. In spring 1929, Fulbright, who had just finished his studies at Oxford as a Rhodes Scholar, joined Fodor on a factfinding trip across several Balkan countries and Greece. Fodor arranged press credentials for Fulbright, and both interviewed diplomats and government leaders across the region.

That sort of mentoring relationship was common for Fodor:

Because of the relationships Fodor developed; his fluency in several languages spoken in Central Europe; and his encyclopedic knowledge of history, politics and personalities of the region, Fodor had a strong reputation among his fellow journalists:

In 1934, Fodor and Gunther interviewed Adolf Hitler's poor relatives in Hitler's Austrian hometown of Braunau, the first journalists to cover Hitler's birthplace, origin, acquaintances and relatives. Their coverage clearly showed Hitler's humble beginnings and family, in stark contrast to the official Nazi propaganda about his origins. For that reason, Gunther and Fodor were soon placed on a Gestapo "death list" and remained in continual danger as the Nazis moved across Europe.

In the tense months leading up to World War II, Fodor and his family narrowly escaped Vienna in March 1938, Czechoslovakia in September 1938 and finally Belgium and France in May and June 1940 as Axis forces moved forward across Europe.

World War II and afterward

From 1940 to 1944, Fodor lived in the United States, working as a professor at the Illinois Institute of Technology and as a columnist with the Chicago Sun. Fodor was also active on the lecture circuit, giving speeches across the United States during World War II. In 1943, Fodor became a US citizen.

After the war, Fodor resumed his journalistic career in Central Europe. Soon he was hired as Berlin Editor of Die Neue Zeitung, a newspaper funded by the US military in postwar Germany.

From 1948 to 1957, Fodor regularly corresponded with Fulbright, now US Senator from Arkansas. Fodor sent Fulbright dozens of memos with summaries and his views of the situation in Europe and the Soviet Union.

Voice of America
After Die Neue Zeitung closed in 1955, Fodor worked for Voice of America as policy director and program evaluator. Fodor retired from Voice of America in 1965.

Death and legacy
He died in Trostberg, Germany, in 1997.

Fodor's obituary in the New York Times, "M. W. Fodor is dead at 87, a famed correspondent", reads in part:
M. W. Fodor, a well-known American foreign correspondent of the 1920s to 1940s who specialized in reporting on the Balkans and Central Europe, died Friday at the age of 87....
Although Mr. Fodor was an authority on the Balkans and Central Europe, his knowledge of all Europe was vast. In his old age he could on request name the deputy police chief in Vienna at the time of the Nazi assassination of Chancellor Engelbert Dollfuss in 1934.... Mr. Fodor, born in Hungary, could speak Hungarian, English, German, French, and Italian fluently....

Works

Books
 Plot and Counterplot in Central Europe. Houghton Mifflin, 1937. Given an expanded and revised edition in 1939 as South of Hitler.
 The Revolution is On. Houghton Mifflin Co., 1940.
 The Russian Riddle. Chicago Sun Syndicate, 1942. A compilation of Fodor's columns written for the Chicago Sun.
 VOA History: 1942 to 1967.  Manuscript, 1967.

A complete list of books and magazine articles along with a selected list of newspaper articles by Fodor is included in Biographical Sketch: Marcel W. Fodor, Foreign Correspondent by Dan Durning.

Further reading
 Marcel W. Fodor, Foreign Correspondent by Dan Durning
 Mike William Fodor – Biography Outline by Fabienne Gouverneur
 South of Hitler by M.W. Fodor: A Review Essay by Dan Durning
 Vienna's Cafe Louvre in the 1920s & 1930s: Meeting Place for Foreign Correspondents by Dan Durning
 Finding M. W. Fodor: Fulbright, Vienna, and Me by Dan Durning
 The Fodor-Fulbright Correspondence, Congress, and Public Diplomacy 1952-53, Donau-Institut Working Paper No. 22, 2013, ISSN 2063-8191 by Fabienne Gouverneur.
 Three articles by M. W. Fodor published in Foreign Affairs magazine, 1936-1940.
 "Suicide by Order" by M. W. Fodor, "Our Central European Correspondent".  The Guardian.  Originally published 22 September 1938, republished 21 September 2008.
 The Lost City by John Gunther. Harper & Rowe, 1964. .  Gunther's Roman-a-clef about interwar Vienna gives an insider's view of the band of journalists and the momentous events they covered. The book includes lightly fictionalized versions of Gunther, Fodor, and other regulars at the Café Louvre.

References

1890 births
1977 deaths
Hungarian journalists
Hungarian writers
Hungarian people of German descent
20th-century American journalists
American male journalists
American war correspondents
Austrian journalists
American political writers
Austrian male writers
Viennese interwar correspondents
Voice of America people